The East German Republic Day Parade of 1989 (Ehrenparade der Nationalen Volksarmee zum 40. Jahrestag der DDR 1989) was a parade on Karl-Marx-Allee (between Strausberger Platz and Alexanderplatz) in East Berlin on 7 October 1989 commemorating the 40th anniversary of the establishment of East Germany. This was the last East German Republic Day Parade and the last major East German political event with the regime falling mere weeks later. In Germany, this parade is remembered as the end of "the great period of military parades".

Description
Defense Minister Army General Heinz Kessler inspected the parade while accompanied by Deputy Minister of Defense, Colonel General Horst Stechbarth who commanded the parade. Military bands from the Military Music Service of the National People's Army representing three of the four services of the Nationale Volksarmee and the Corps of Drums of the Friedrich Engels Guard Regiment performed the military marches at the parade, including the Präsentiermasrch nationalevolksarmee and te Parademarsch № 1 der Nationalen Volksarmee. The event was accompanied by protests and more than 1,000 demonstrators were arrested. The live transmission on television of the GDR was commented by the reporter Bert Sprafke.

There was also a naval parade (Flottenparade) of the NVA's Volksmarine in the port city of Rostock. It was led by Admiral Theodor Hoffmann, Commander of the Volksmarine.

Attendees and international guests

GDR
 General Secretary National Defense Council Chairman Erich Honecker
 Prime Minister Willi Stoph
 Volkskammer President Horst Sindermann
 Minister of Defense Army General Heinz Kessler
 Minister of National Education and Spouse of the Chairman of the State Council Margot Honecker
 Secretary of the Magdeburg District Committee of the SED Werner Eberlein

Foreign
 Soviet Chairman and Communist Party General Secretary Mikhail Gorbachev and his wife Raisa Gorbacheva
 Romanian President Nicolae Ceausescu
 Bulgarian Chairman Todor Zhivkov
 Mongolian Chairman and People's Revolutionary Party General Secretary Jambyn Batmönkh
 Polish President Wojciech Jaruzelski
 Polish United Workers' Party First Secretary Mieczysław Rakowski
 Nicaraguan President Daniel Ortega
 Czechoslovak Communist Party First Secretary Miloš Jakeš
 Palestinian Leader Yasser Arafat

Gallery

See also
Monday demonstrations in East Germany
Revolutions of 1989
National Day of the Rebirth of Poland

External links

 Official footage of the parade
 Erich Honecker and Mikhail Gorbachev at the GDR's 40th Anniversary Celebration (October 7, 1989)

References 

Military parades in East Germany
1989 in East Germany
October 1989 events in Europe